Soft commodities, or softs, are commodities such as coffee, cocoa, sugar, corn, wheat, soybean, fruit and livestock. The term generally refers to commodities that are grown, rather than mined; the latter (such as oil, copper and gold) are known as hard commodities.

Soft commodities play a major part in the futures market. They are used by farmers wishing to lock-in the future prices of their crops, by commercial purchasers of the products, and by speculative investors seeking a profit. The adjective "soft" is occasionally only applied to products that are classified as largely tropical, such coffee, chocolate, sugar, cotton, and orange juice.

Soft commodities have been known to adopt a backwardation trend until the late 1990s when futures were actively traded. Speculation and investment requirements later shaped the common contango trend.

See also
Commodification
Commodity status of animals

References